Gafur Nasir oglu Mammadov (5 March 1922  18 October 1942) was an Azerbaijani Soviet Navy Matros (ordinary seaman) and a posthumous Hero of the Soviet Union. Mammadov was posthumously awarded the title on 31 March 1943 for reportedly shielding his commander from fire with his body.

Early life 
Mammadov was born on 5 March 1922 in Baku in a working-class family. He graduated from primary school. Mammadov became a typesetter in the Printing House named after the 26 Baku Commissars.

World War II 
Mammadov was drafted into the Red Army in August 1941 following the German invasion of the Soviet Union. Mammadov became a naval infantryman in the Black Sea Fleet's 323rd Separate Naval Infantry Battalion. Mammadov fought in combat from September 1941. He fought in the Battle of the Caucasus. Mammadov fought in the defense of Tuapse. On 19 October 1942, during a battle northwest of Tuapse, the battalion's defenses were penetrated by German troops. The command post of Mammadov's company was surrounded by German troops. Mammadov and other soldiers reportedly repulsed German attacks. He reportedly killed thirteen German soldiers, before being killed shielding his commander from German fire. Mammadov was buried in Tuapse. On 31 March 1943, Mammadov was awarded the title Hero of the Soviet Union and the Order of Lenin for his actions.

Legacy 
Mammadov was permanently listed on the rolls of his unit. The Baku Marine College was named after him. A ship of the Ministry of the River Fleet of the USSR was named for him. A street in Baku was named after him, and a bust was placed there. A park in Baku also bears his name and contains a statue of him.

References

1922 births
1942 deaths
Heroes of the Soviet Union
Recipients of the Order of Lenin
Military personnel from Baku
Soviet military personnel of World War II from Azerbaijan
Soviet military personnel killed in World War II
Soviet Navy personnel